Infiltration Art is a branch of Intervention Art in which artists collaborate with institutions, communities, politicians, religions, museums and pop-culture figures outside of the traditional art world. Unlike other forms of intervention art, Infiltration Art seeks to create symbiotic relationships with the host institutions.

Artists whose work incorporates elements of infiltration include Banksy, Christian Cummings, Nikki S. Lee, Taryn Simon, Jeffrey Vallance, David Hildebrand Wilson, Fred Wilson, the Nationwide Museum Mascot Project (NWMMP).

External links
The Art of Infiltration class at California Institute of the Arts.
Profile on Nikki S. Lee by Rodrigo Maltez-Novaes, DimSum magazine, January 23, 2002.
Profile on Nikki S. Lee by Chas Bowie, Portland Mercury, May 1, 2003.
Interview with Jeffrey Vallance, WhiteHot Magazine, March 2011.
David Pagel interview with Jeffrey Vallance, Bomb magazine, Summer 1996.
Review of Popocultural exhibition at South London Gallery, Frieze Magazine, May 1997.
Review of Banksy exhibition at Bristol City Museum, by Helen Weaver, Art in America, September 18, 2009.
The Nationwide Museum Mascot Project (NWMMP)
Interview with the Nationwide Museum Mascot Project, Blouin Artinfo, June 1, 2012.

Visual arts genres